Lost in Florence (previously titled The Tourist) is a 2017 romantic drama film written and directed by Evan Oppenheimer and starring Brett Dalton, Alessandra Mastronardi, Alessandro Preziosi and Stana Katic.<ref name="Città di Firenze 19 June 2014">{{cite news|last1=staff|title=The Tourist, Firenze set del film di Oppenheimer sul calcio storico|url=http://portalegiovani.comune.fi.it/pogio/jsp/portalegiovani_urw_rubriche.jsp?ID_REC=8472|access-date=29 January 2016|publisher=Città di Firenze|language=Italian|date=19 June 2014}}</ref>

The sport played in the film is Calcio Fiorentino, an ancient form of soccer that has been played in Florence since the sixteenth century.

Cast

Production
Originally titled The Tourist'', filming took place on location in Florence, Italy for four weeks beginning 9 June 2014, and filming completed around 10 July 2014.

Release
In 2016, two years after production, the film was picked up for distribution by Orion Pictures and Gunpowder & Sky, and was released on 27 January 2017.

References

External links

2017 films
2017 independent films
2017 romantic drama films
American independent films
American romantic drama films
Italian romantic drama films
Italian independent films
Orion Pictures films
2010s English-language films
2010s American films